Heavy Love is an album by the American blues musician Buddy Guy, released in 1998. It was nominated for a Grammy Award, in the "Best Contemporary Blues Album" category.

The album peaked at No. 163 on the Billboard 200.

Production
Produced by David Z, the album was recorded in Nashville. In an attempt to get the album played on popular radio, Guy added synthetic drums and tape loops to some tracks. 

Jonny Lang duets with Guy on the album's lead single, "Midnight Train".

Critical reception

Entertainment Weekly wrote that the album focuses on "tight songs, concise, off-kilter solos, funk-tinged grooves, and impassioned vocals." The Daily Herald called "Did Somebody Make a Fool Outta You" "a mesmerizing piece of fretwork and utter soul." The Chicago Tribune opined that "the methodical finale, 'Let Me Show You', showcases the singer's soft, tearful, underrated voice."

AllMusic thought that "purists will cringe at the unabashed commercial concessions," but acknowledged that "Heavy Love works well when compared to the modern electric blues of the post-Stevie Ray Vaughan era, especially since Guy once again contributes some scorching solos." (The New) Rolling Stone Album Guide deemed the album "refreshingly modern, if uneven."

Track listing

Personnel
 Buddy Guy - guitar, vocals
 Jack Holder - guitar
 Reese Wynans - keyboards
 David M. Smith - bass guitar
 Richie Hayward - drums
 David Z - percussion
 Jonny Lang - guitar, vocals (track 2)
 Steve Cropper - guitar (tracks 1, 5, 7 to 11)

References

Buddy Guy albums
1998 albums